We Have Issues is an American comedy infotainment series which aired on E! in the early fall of 2015. The half-hour weekly show is hosted by comedians Julian McCullough and Annie Lederman, who both discuss the biggest pop culture news of the week through the vector of gossip magazines and websites. A weekly guest comedian also appeared.

McCullough and Lederman both appeared together on the late-night series @midnight and separately on various other panel talk shows, including and Chelsea Lately.

Hosts 
 Julian McCullough
 Annie Lederman

Broadcast
The show debuted on the E! cable network in the United States on September 18, 2015, after another pop culture news-based series The Soup.. Internationally, the series premiered on E! Australia on September 23, 2015.

References

External links

 
 

2010s American late-night television series
2015 American television series debuts
2015 American television series endings
English-language television shows
E! original programming
Infotainment